Elections to Colchester Borough Council were held in 1979 alongside other local elections across the country.

Summary

Ward results

Berechurch

Castle

Copford & Eight Ash Green

Great & Little Horksley

Great Tey

Harbour

Lexden

Mile End

New Town
 
 
 

 

 

No Liberal candidate as previous (–6.2).

Prettygate

Pyefleet

Shrub End

St. Andrews

St. Annes

St. Johns

St. Marys

Stanway

Tiptree

 
 
 

 

No Labour candidate as previous (–13.2).

West Mersea

Wivenhoe

References

1979
1979 English local elections
1970s in Essex